Kangiryuarmiutun (sometimes Kangirjuarmiut(un)), is a dialect of Inuit language spoken in Ulukhaktok, Northwest Territories, Canada by the Kangiryuarmiut, a Copper Inuit group. The dialect is part of the Inuvialuktun language. The people of Ulukhaktok prefer to think of it as Inuinnaqtun and it is essentially the same.

It is derived from Kangiryuak (meaning "the big bay"), and named for the people that lived there, the Kangiryuarmiut,  which is known by its English name Prince Albert Sound, Victoria Island. Victoria Island is the ancestral home of the Copper Inuit.

Vocabulary comparison 
The comparison of some animal names in the Siglitun and Kangiryuarmiutun subdialects of the Inuinnaqtun dialect of Inuvialuktun:

See also
 Uummarmiutun

References

External links
Inuvaluit Region - Languages

Agglutinative languages
Indigenous languages of the North American Arctic
Inuvialuit languages
Copper Inuit
Inuktitut words and phrases